John O'Leary (January 16, 1947 – April 2, 2005) served as mayor of Portland, Maine, and as United States ambassador to Chile under President Bill Clinton.

Personal life
O'Leary was born in Portland and graduated from Yale University in 1969. He later attended Clare College, Cambridge University, on a Mellon fellowship and received a master's degree in 1971. He received a degree from Yale Law School in 1974. While studying at Yale Law, O'Leary acted as a coach for the Yale debate team. He then went on to a private law practice.

O'Leary married a fellow Yale student, Patricia Cepeda, the daughter of Colombian writer Álvaro Cepeda Samudio. John and Patricia O'Leary had two daughters. The O'Learys endowed the John O'Leary and Patricia Cepeda Fellowship for the Study of Latin America at Yale College.

Political career
He served as a member of the Portland City Council 1975-82) and for a term as that city's largely ceremonial Mayor (1980–81).  He ran unsuccessful candidate for the U.S. House from Maine's First Congressional District in 1982, losing in the Democratic primary.

References

Sources

External links
 "John O'Leary: Working towards justice for Pinochet's victims" David Sugarman, The Guardian, 20 May 2005
 "Tale of Two Ambassadors: One exposed the death squads, the other covered them up" Marc Cooper, LA Weekly, 14 April 2005
 "Nomination of John O'Leary to be United States Ambassador to Chile" Olympia Snow, Congressional Record, 26 June 1998
 John O'Leary Papers Georgetown University

Alumni of Clare College, Cambridge
20th-century American lawyers
Deaths from motor neuron disease
Neurological disease deaths in Washington, D.C.
Mayors of Portland, Maine
Ambassadors of the United States to Chile
Yale Law School alumni
1947 births
2005 deaths
20th-century American politicians